Patrick H. McEnroe was a Union Army soldier during the American Civil War. He received the Medal of Honor for gallantry during the Battle of Opequon more commonly called the Third Battle of Winchester, Virginia on September 19, 1864.

Aged 39, McEnroe enlisted in the Army from Schodack, New York in November 1862. He was mustered out in June 1865.

Medal of Honor citation
"The President of the United States of America, in the name of Congress, takes pleasure in presenting the Medal of Honor to Sergeant Patrick H. McEnroe, United States Army, for extraordinary heroism on 19 September 1864, while serving with Company D, 6th New York Cavalry Regiment, in action at Winchester, Virginia, for capture of colors of 36th Virginia Infantry (Confederate States of America)."

Sgt. McEnroe was one of two troopers of the 6th New York Cavalry to receive the Medal of Honor for this action. The other was Farrier George E. Meach.

See also

 List of Medal of Honor recipients
 List of American Civil War Medal of Honor recipients: M-P

References

External links
 Military Times Hall of Valor

Year of birth missing
Year of death missing
19th-century Irish people
Irish soldiers in the United States Army
Irish emigrants to the United States (before 1923)
People of New York (state) in the American Civil War
Union Army soldiers
United States Army Medal of Honor recipients
Irish-born Medal of Honor recipients
American Civil War recipients of the Medal of Honor